The vice president of Suriname is the second-highest political position in Suriname, after the president. The president and the vice president are elected by the National Assembly for five-year terms.

The position of vice president was created in the Constitution of 1987, when the position of prime minister of Suriname was abolished. The vice president is charged with the day-to-day management of the Council of Ministers and is responsible to the President.

Ronnie Brunswijk is the incumbent vice president of Suriname as of 16 July 2020. Brunswijk was elected on 13 July 2020 as vice president by acclamation in an uncontested election and inaugurated on 16 July on the Onafhankelijkheidsplein in Paramaribo in ceremony without public due to the COVID-19 pandemic.

Powers and duties
The powers of the president are exercised by the vice president:
 In case the president is declared unfit to exercise his powers;
 In case the president has laid down the exercise of his powers temporarily;
 As long as there is no president or if he is absent;
 If, in the case described in article 140, prosecution against the President has been initiated.

List of vice presidents

Political parties

Timeline

See also
 Politics of Suriname
 List of colonial governors of Suriname
 President of Suriname
 First Lady of Suriname
 List of prime ministers of Suriname
 List of deputy prime ministers of Suriname

Notes

References

Politics of Suriname
Lists of political office-holders in Suriname
 
Suriname
1988 establishments in Suriname